The 500 metres speed skating event was part of the speed skating at the 1948 Winter Olympics programme. The competition was held on Saturday, 31 January 1948. Forty-two speed skaters from 15 nations competed.

Medalists

Records
These were the standing world and Olympic records (in seconds) prior to the 1948 Winter Olympics.

(*) The record was set in a high altitude venue (more than 1000 metres above sea level) and on naturally frozen ice.

(**) This time was set in pack-style format, having all competitors skate at the same time.

Five speed skaters were faster than the standing Olympic record. Finn Helgesen set a time of 43.1 seconds.

Results

References

External links
Official Olympic Report
 

Speed skating at the 1948 Winter Olympics